Appadurai is the surname of the following people

Surname
Arjun Appadurai (born in 1949), Indian-American anthropologist
M. Appadurai (born in 1949), Indian politician

Middle name
Subbier Appadurai Ayer (1898-1980), Indian minister

Given name
Appadurai Muttulingam, Sri Lankan author and essayist